Mike Peterson Maignan (born 3 July 1995) is a French professional footballer who plays as a goalkeeper for  club AC Milan and the France national team.

Maignan came through the youth teams at Paris Saint-Germain, he was an unused substitute several times. In 2015 he joined Lille for €1 million, and became their first-choice in 2017. He was voted Ligue 1's goalkeeper of the year in 2018–19, and won the league title in 2020–21. He then moved to AC Milan for €15 million, winning Serie A in his first season and making the Team of the Season.

After earning 37 caps for France at youth level, Maignan made his senior international debut in 2020. He was selected in the French squad for UEFA Euro 2020.

Early years
Maignan was born in Cayenne, French Guiana, to a Haitian mother and a Guadeloupean father.

Club career

Paris Saint-Germain
Maignan played in the lower categories of Paris Saint-Germain before being promoted in 2013 to the first team. He participated in the 2013–14 UEFA Youth League in which his team reached the quarter-finals, being eliminated by Real Madrid.

In June 2013 Maignan signed his first professional contract, of three years. On 18 December, he was in a matchday squad for the first time, sitting on the bench for Nicolas Douchez in a 2–1 win over Saint-Étienne in the last 16 of the Coupe de la Ligue. On 19 January 2014 he was included in a Ligue 1 game for the first time, remaining unused as Salvatore Sirigu played in a 5–0 win over Nantes at the Parc des Princes.

Lille

In August 2015, Maignan transferred to fellow Ligue 1 club Lille for €1 million on a five-year deal. He made his professional debut on 18 September in a 1–1 draw at Rennes, as a substitute for Yassine Benzia after Vincent Enyeama was sent off in the 69th minute. With his first touch, he saved the penalty from Paul-Georges Ntep; however, in five minutes, he conceded a goal from the same player.

At the start of the 2017–18 season, manager Marcelo Bielsa dropped the experienced Enyeama for Maignan. In the second game of the season, a 3–0 loss at Strasbourg, he was sent off for throwing the ball at an opponent and striker Nicolas de Préville had to go in goal for the final minutes. The following season, he was an ever-present as Lille finished as runners-up to PSG, and was elected Goalkeeper of the year in the Trophées UNFP du football. His record was 30 goals conceded, 17 clean sheets, 233 saves and three penalties saved.

In 2020–21, Maignan won the Ligue 1 title, beating his former club PSG on the final day by one point. Maignan finished the season with 21 clean sheets, one short of the league record.

AC Milan

On 27 May 2021, Maignan agreed to sign for Serie A club AC Milan on a five-year contract, effective from 1 July. He arrived for a reported fee of €15 million, as a replacement for PSG-bound Gianluigi Donnarumma. He made his debut on 23 August, a 1–0 win at Sampdoria.

On 19 September in a league match against Juventus, Maignan was the victim of verbal racial abuse by a Juventus supporter; he responded by calling himself "black and proud". The supporter was later identified and reported to police, and expelled from the Juventus Club Castagnaro fan club. 

On 13 October 2021, Maignan underwent surgery to his left wrist injury and he was expected to be out of action for ten weeks, but returned to the field after six  weeks. He made crucial saves against Inter, to help his team win a narrow 2–1 derby on 5 February.
Eight days later, he assisted Rafael Leão's goal in a 1–0 win against Sampdoria, being the first assist made by an AC Milan goalkeeper in Serie A since Dida in 2006.

Maignan was awarded the trophy for Best Goalkeeper in Serie A ahead of the last match of the season on 22 May 2022. Milan won the game 3–0 away to Sassuolo for their first league title since 2011; it was his record 17th clean sheet of the season.

International career
Maignan played for France at every level from under-16 to under-21. He captained the under-17 side at the 2012 European Championship in Slovenia. He received his first senior call-up in May 2019, ahead of UEFA Euro 2020 qualifiers against Turkey and Andorra and a friendly with Bolivia. He made his debut on 7 October 2020 as a half-time substitute for Steve Mandanda in a friendly against Ukraine, which ended as a 7–1 win at the Stade de France. In May 2021, he was called up for the delayed Euro 2020 finals.

On 6 June 2022, Maignan made his competitive international debut in a 1–1 UEFA Nations League draw away to Croatia, conceding a late penalty by Andrej Kramarić. Calf injuries in September and October that year ruled him out of the 2022 FIFA World Cup.

Career statistics

Club

International

Honours
Lille
Ligue 1: 2020–21

AC Milan
Serie A: 2021–22

France
UEFA Nations League: 2020–21

Individual
UNFP Ligue 1 Goalkeeper of the Year: 2018–19
UNFP Ligue 1 Team of the Year: 2018–19
Serie A Best Goalkeeper: 2021–22
Serie A Team of the Year: 2021–22

References

External links

Profile at the AC Milan website

1995 births
Living people
Sportspeople from Cayenne
French footballers
French Guianan footballers
Association football goalkeepers
Paris Saint-Germain F.C. players
Lille OSC players
A.C. Milan players
Championnat National 2 players
Championnat National 3 players
Ligue 1 players
Serie A players
France youth international footballers
France under-21 international footballers
France international footballers
UEFA Euro 2020 players
UEFA Nations League-winning players
French expatriate footballers
Expatriate footballers in Italy
French expatriate sportspeople in Italy
French people of French Guianan descent
French sportspeople of Haitian descent
French Guianan people of Haitian descent